Flynn: Son of Crimson is an action-platform video game developed by Studio Thunderhorse and published by Humble Games. The game follows a young boy named Flynn, who embarks on a journey of discovery and conflict alongside his animal companion Dex as he learns to master his powers. Flynn and Dex must save Rosantica before the evil from The Scourge claims his home.

The game was released on September 15, 2021 on Microsoft Windows, Playstation 4, Xbox One and Nintendo Switch. Flynn: Son of Crimson was successfully crowdfunded on Kickstarter on October 24, 2017, raising over $63,000.

Gameplay 
Flynn: Son of Crimson features fast-paced combat with a wealth of hard-hitting attack combos. There are over 40 unique stages, each with varying challenges and mechanics. Players can collect gems to then unlock and upgrade brand new skills to accommodate their playstyle. In most stages, players encounter many different enemies, including carnivorous plants, goblins, rabid wolves and giant insects. Minibosses and tougher enemies soon enter the stage in the form of environment-specific knights and Scourge knights. Dealing with some enemies in Flynn: Son of Crimson can be as simple as dodge-rolling at the right moment to avoid incoming attacks, then dealing damage from behind or by using more advanced techniques, such as freezing them in place or instantly stunning them with electric magic. A stun meter is introduced early in the game and is used throughout to allow players to build up a yellow gauge above the enemy until it becomes stunned (shown by dizzying stars) for a few seconds. Doing so  allows for multiple safe attacks without enemy retaliation.

Along with close range melee combat, players are introduced to ranged magic fireballs very early on, which can provide an alternate way to defeat some enemies at a safe distance. Ranged magic is unlimited but considerably weaker than close range combat. Flynn eventually gains access to a charged version of ranged magic, with players holding the button to charge up a more powerful shot, releasing it at an opportune moment. Charged magic is also upgraded with elemental effects, including ice, electric and fire.

Throughout the adventure, players collect Crimson gems. Non-player characters (NPCs) throughout the game offer hints about Flynn’s past and occasionally give players small tasks in exchange for gems or keys, which unlock challenge levels located in each region of the game map. Players may visit a NPC named Loretta at any point in the village of Sanctia, the game’s main hub area, to trade gems in exchange for learning new skills. Players may sell any relics they find to another NPC named  Yombal for 1,000 gems.

Plot 
Flynn: Son of Crimson tells its story through NPC dialogue and short, comic-like images. The game's story begins as Flynn is taking a nap outside his home on Cardinal Island, a quaint, somewhat isolated part of the mainland, Rosantica. He is given the small task of taking his loyal, mythical dog Dex out for her walk whilst also taking Bohrin’s (the first NPC in the game) wooden sword out to practice and trim some overgrown vines. Heather is pleased when they arrive, calling Dex a "good girl".

During this time, Flynn and Dex take another nap after meeting with a second helping of mainline NPCs (Heather, Bax and Beagy). Soon after a small amount of progression through Cardinal Island, Dex meets an antagonistic character named Rozia. The initial fight with Rozia starts off as a scripted, unwinnable battle that eventually leads to Flynn acquiring the first Crimson weaponry. Once the fight is over, Rozia then proceeds to drain Dex of her 4 guardian spirits. This starts the main story progression.

Development 
Developed by Studio Thunderhorse over the span of 5 years, Flynn: Son of Crimson began to take form in late 2016. After working on 2 smaller games for iOS, the team moved onto the larger, more ambitious project. The game started out as a larger, sprawling metroidvania and was partially shown in a Kickstarter demo. This early design choice however was changed mid-2018 to a more straight-forward approach, including a stage based map (akin to Super Mario World on the Super Nintendo Entertainment System), allowing the team to focus on interesting level design and progression without in-level backtracking.

In July 2019, Studio Thunderhorse announced their partnership with Humble Games for a publishing deal that funded development from then onwards. Humble Games announced the game to be one of ten Humble Games titles to be released on Xbox Game Pass on day one and released a Release Date trailer for the game on August 31, 2021.

On December 1, 2021, the game had its first major update. Update V1.1 included "Hero Mode", which gives players the opportunity to restart the game with all their learned skills and acquired weapons once they reach 101% completion. The update also included some difficulty tweaks and quality of life improvements.

Reception 
Flynn: Son of Crimson received "generally favorable" reviews on review aggregation website, Metacritic.

The game also received reviews from a range of video game media outlets, praising its gameplay, art-style and range of puzzles and weapons. However, some reviewers also stated that the game causes players to backtrack unnecessarily, and that the adventure is relatively short.

References 

Side-scrolling platform games
2021 video games
Kickstarter-funded video games
Humble Games games
Windows games
Xbox One games
PlayStation 4 games
Nintendo Switch games
Indie video games
Fantasy video games
Video games about dogs
Video games developed in the United States